Blackshirts were originally the paramilitary wing of the Italian National Fascist Party.

Blackshirts or Black Shirt may also refer to:

 Blackshirts (India), an anti-religious atheist quasi-political movement in India
 British Union of Fascists, whose party nickname was "Blackshirts"
 Stewards, their paramilitary unit
 Schutzstaffel (SS), Nazi military organization who had the nickname as they wore black and brown uniforms, compared to the "brownshirts" Sturmabteilung (SA)
 Blackshirts (American football), the informal name for the University of Nebraska-Lincoln football team defense
 Black Shirt (film), a 1933 Italian drama film
 "La Camisa Negra", a 2006 song by Juanes which translates to "The Black Shirt"
 The Blackshirt, the official newspaper of Oswald Mosley's British Union of Fascists